Félix-Antoine Savard,  (August 31, 1896 – August 24, 1982) was a Canadian priest, academic, poet, novelist and folklorist.

Born in Quebec City, he grew up in Chicoutimi, Quebec. He received a Bachelor of Arts in 1918 and was ordained a priest in 1922. He occupied several ecclesiastical positions in Charlevoix and Saguenay before founding the  parish of Clermont in Charlevoix.

While in Clermont, Savard explored the Charlevoix countryside and became well acquainted with the local log drivers. The mountains of Charlevoix were the setting for his 1937 novel Menaud, maître draveur which made him famous and earned him a medal from the Académie française. It remains to this day one of the best-known works of Quebec literature. Like Maria Chapdeleine, the title character Menaud has become a key figure in Quebec's national identity.

He joined the Faculty of Arts at Université Laval in 1945 and from 1950 to 1957 was its dean.

Works

 Menaud maître-draveur, novel, Québec, Librairie Garneau, 1937 (translation: Boss of the river, translated by Alan Sullivan, Toronto, Ryerson Press, 1947).
 L'abatis, poems and souvenirs, Montréal, 1943.
 La Minuit, novel, Montréal, Éditions Fides, 1948.
 Martin et le pauvre, legend, Montréal, Éditions Fides, 1959.
 Le Barachois, poems and souvenirs, Montréal, Éditions Fides, 1959.
 La Folle, play, Montréal, Éditions Fides, 1960.
 La Dalle-des-morts, play, Montréal, Éditions Fides, 1965.
 La Symphonie du Misereror, Ottawa, Éditions de l'Université d'Ottawa, 1968.
 Le Bouscueuil, poems and souvenirs, Montréal, Éditions Fides, 1972.
 La roche Ursule, poems, Québec, 1972. Ce poème est extrait du Bouscueil.
 Journal et souvenirs, poems and souvenirs, Montréal, Éditions Fides, 1973.
 Aux marges du silence, poems, Québec, Librairie Garneau, 1975.

Honours
 In 1945, he was awarded the Lorne Pierce Medal.
 1959 Governor General's Awards for Malgré tout, la joie.
 In 1968, he was made an Officer of the Order of Canada.
 In 1969, he was awarded the Prix Athanase-David.
 In 2005, his book Menaud, maître-draveur (Boss of the River) (1937) was selected as one of Canada's 100 Most Important Books by the Literary Review of Canada.

References

External links
  Archives of Félix-Antoine Savard (Fonds Félix-Antoine Savard, R11830) are held at Library and Archives Canada

1896 births
1982 deaths
20th-century Canadian Roman Catholic priests
20th-century Canadian poets
Canadian male poets
Canadian university and college faculty deans
Canadian poets in French
Officers of the Order of Canada
Writers from Quebec City
Writers from Saguenay, Quebec
Prix Athanase-David winners
Governor General's Award-winning poets
Governor General's Award-winning non-fiction writers
20th-century Canadian novelists
Canadian male novelists
Canadian novelists in French
Canadian non-fiction writers
20th-century Canadian male writers
Canadian male non-fiction writers
Academic staff of Université Laval
20th-century non-fiction writers